Jason Lovett (born 18 July 1975 from Norwich) is a professional English darts player who plays in World Darts Federation events.

Career
He earned a PDC Tour Card in 2015, and qualified for the 2014 UK Open, but lost in the first round have losing to Simon Stevenson.

Personal life
Lovett is married to Roz Bulmer, a professional darts player.

References

External links
Profile and stats on Darts Database

1975 births
Living people
English darts players
Sportspeople from Norwich
Professional Darts Corporation former tour card holders